Nancy Horner was a Scottish badminton player and prominent badminton official.

Horner was the Vice-President of the Badminton Association of England from 1967 to 1975 and was the only female member on an eighty strong list at the time. She won 15 caps for Scotland as a player and won every available title in the Scottish Open and the English National Badminton Championships.

A regular competitor in the All England Open Badminton Championships, she reached the quarter finals in 1950 and won three Scottish Open titles in 1953.

References

Scottish female badminton players
1925 births
1984 deaths